Robert Livingstone is a Canadian journalist. He is the creator and producer of GamesBids, a news and information website for the Olympic Games bid process, since 1998.  He is a member of the International Society of Olympic Historians and "is widely considered one of the world’s foremost experts on the Olympic bidding process."

Covering the Olympic bid process
Livingstone's specialty is the Olympic Games' site selection process and he frequently comments in the media as a notable expert on the issues related to hosting of the Olympic Games by various cities.

Robert Livingstone wrote a weekly op-ed column about New York's 2012 Olympic bid in the New York Sun newspaper.

In 1998 he launched GamesBids.com, a reference site for Olympic bids as well as BidIndex, an original Olympic bid rating system. There, he also serves as senior journalist.

Since 2000, Livingstone has been said to have been "comprehensively covering all Olympic bids for over two decades".  He also covers bids for Commonwealth Games, FIFA World Cup, Pan American Games, Asian Games and more in both journalistic and opinion pieces.

Livingstone is an expert on all Olympic bids, but was noteworthy during the failed Calgary 2026 Olympic bid when he published his "Dear Calgary:" series that guided the city through the complexities of an Olympic bid prior to a decisive plebiscite.  The series received media acclaim in Calgary along with several Q&A interviews.  Calgary mayor Naheed Nenshi apparently took inspiration from Livingstone's remarks during his 2026 Olympic bid campaign when he said “This has been called the most transparent process in Olympic history.” "The mayor was alluding to a tweet from GamesBids.com journalist Robert Livingstone, who covers Olympic bids worldwide" a journalist from The Sprawl reported.

As a long-time Olympic journalist, in 2014 Livingstone was invited to carry the torch in the Sochi 2014 Winter Olympics torch relay where he ran a leg in Khanty-Mansiysk, Russia. In 2010, Livingstone became one of the first web-only journalists accredited to cover the Olympic Games.

Television, video, radio and podcasts
Livingstone appeared as an expert on the television show  to discuss the controversial Olympic bid vote-buying scandal involving Salt Lake City.  He also appeared as an Olympic bid expert on show  where he discussed issues with siting the Olympic Winter Games.

In 2021, Livingstone was featured in an Olympic-themed Off The Podium podcast which discussed his career included becoming one of the first-ever web-only journalists to receive accreditation to cover the Olympic Games and running in the Olympic torch relay at the Sochi 2014 Olympic Winter Games

Livingstone appeared in a CBC Sports Program "The Breakdown" in 2022 that took a critical look at the history behind Beijing being awarded the 2022 Olympic Winter Games, a process that he extensively covered with multiple visits to China, Switzerland, Indonesia and Kazakhstan from 2013 to 2014.

Livingstone had also been a guest on several radio programs including in 2021 on the Scott Radley Show in Hamilton, Ontario, Canada to discuss the city's Commonwealth Games bid.

Awards
In 2015, Livingstone was nominated for an inaugural International Sports Press Association Sport Media Pearl Award in the category of "Journalistic Weblog" for his work on GamesBids.com. In 2018 he was ranked first in North and South America.

References

1967 births
Living people
Businesspeople from Toronto
York University alumni